John de Ponz, also called John de Ponte, John Savan, or John of Bridgwater (c.1248-1307) was an English-born administrator, lawyer and judge in the reign of King Edward I. He served in the Royal Household for several years before moving to Ireland, where he practised in the Royal Courts as the King's Serjeant-at-law (Ireland). He later served as a justice in eyre (itinerant justice), and then as a justice of the Court of Common Pleas (Ireland). He was clearly a gifted lawyer, but as a judge, he was accused of acting unjustly.

Family 

He was born in or shortly before 1248 in Bridgwater, Somerset (hence a common version of his surname, which translates as "John of the Bridge"). He later owned property in the town. His father's name is unknown, but he had at least two brothers, Henry and Roger. Roger was a clerk to Thomas Weyland, the English Chief Justice of the Common Pleas: soon after Weyland's downfall and exile in 1289/90, Roger took up employment in Ireland on the staff of the Justiciar of Ireland, William de Vesci.

Career 

John was in the entourage of the future King Edward I of England in 1269–70, and in about 1372 he joined the household of Edward's first Queen, Eleanor of Castile, whom he served for many years in several capacities, including deputy steward of the Queen's household and Constable of Leeds Castle, Kent, which the Queen bought in 1378.

It may have been the Queen's death in November 1290 which prompted him to join his brother Roger in Ireland the following year. He became King's Serjeant in 1292, and was unusual in acting for the Crown only, whereas most Serjeants, like his contemporary William of Bardfield, also took private clients. His lack of a private income no doubt explains why his salary was fixed at 20 marks a year, twice that of the other Serjeants. His workload was alleviated by the appointment of John de Neville as an extra Serjeant in 1295. Hart argues that his career shows him to have been a lawyer of considerable talent. This is reflected in the fact that he was the most active royal attorney in pleading cases before the Justiciar's Court. He was also licensed to appear before the Court of Common Pleas (Ireland) and the Court of Exchequer (Ireland).

He remained Serjeant until 1300, while also acting regularly as an extra judge of assize and gaol delivery. He may also have served briefly as a temporary judge of the Common Pleas in 1295-6. In 1300 he was one of the four justices appointed to hear the pleas in County Louth (William Alysaundre being another). In 1301 he received a permanent appointment as justice in eyre (itinerant justice) for four counties including County Kilkenny, County Tipperary (where his conduct gave rise to complaints of injustice), and County Cork. In 1302-3 he was justice for County  Meath, with a salary of 40 marks. In 1304 he was appointed a justice of the Court of Common Pleas (which was then simply called "the Bench").

Judge- the case of Treasure Trove (1302) 

In 1302, as he was the designated royal justice for County Kilkenny, the King ordered him to investigate a complaint by William Outlawe, a leading citizen of Kilkenny, that William le Kyteler or Kiteler, High Sheriff of County Kilkenny, on the orders of the Seneschal of Kilkenny, Fulk de la Freyne, had entered his house with an armed force, dug up the floorboards, and unlawfully carried off a very large sum of money, amounting to £3000 deposited with William Outlawe by Adam and Alice le Blound of Callan, County Kilkenny, and £100 of William's own money. John was to investigate, retrieve the money, and secure it with his seal. The Crown had a particular interest since it had reports that Adam's money treasure trove, and therefore Crown property, although the writ stated that no action should be taken concerning the money, pending a judgement of the Royal Court on ownership. It is interesting that both the Williams belonged to families which had a close connection with the celebrated Kilkenny Witch Trials twenty years later.

Judge - the case of Elena Macotyr 

We have another valuable glimpse of his judicial role when he was serving as justice for County Tipperary in 1304, shortly before his elevation to the Court of Common Pleas. His conduct in this case, where his judgment was successfully appealed, suggests that he acted in an unfair and high-handed manner. Walter, son of William de Dermor, brought an action for novel disseisin (the usual remedy for a plaintiff who claimed to have been wrongfully dispossessed of their property) against Elena Macotyr, his stepmother, and her second husband Thomas le Bret, to recover a house in Cashel and 300 acres of land. He was successful, but Elena and Thomas appealed to the Justiciar's court: the main grounds of appeal were bias on the part of certain of the jurors, and that they had not been given the fifteen days notice to which they were entitled to answer the summons. De Ponz, in defence of his conduct, gave the somewhat haughty reply that he had allowed the case to proceed "by his own will". It seems that the appeal was upheld, and that Elena and Thomas retained possession of the disputed lands.

A less contentious case was an action by John de Cogan in assize of mort d'ancestor, i.e. an action by the heir to property against another party who had wrongfully taken it. The case was heard by De Ponz and Thomas Cantock, the Lord Chancellor of Ireland, and the plaintiff was successful.

Personal life

He held lands in Dorset as well as at Bridgwater, and also at Grelly in County Dublin, which he held as sub-tenant from the tenant in chief, Jordan Dardis (or Dardyz). His Irish estates provided him with a useful source of income as well as a residence.

He was not a priest, though he may have taken minor orders, which were not an impediment to marriage. Clearly, he was not celibate: there was an official complaint against him in 1291 by the cellarer of Norwich Cathedral, for assault and for consorting with prostitutes within the precincts of the Cathedral. 

One Avelina atte Crutch of Essex, the wife of Alan Waldeschef, had her marriage annulled before 1397, on the basis of a pre-existing contract of marriage with John. As far as we know the couple never married.

He was still alive in the autumn of 1306, and probably died in 1307.

Sources
Ball, F. Elrington The Judges in Ireland 1221-1921 London John Murray 1926
Brand, Paul "Bridgewater, John (Savan) of, (John de Ponte)" Cambridge Dictionary of Irish Biography 2009
Hand, Geoffrey English Law in Ireland 1290-1324 Cambridge University Press 1967
Hart, A.R. A History of the King's Serjeants-at-law in Ireland Dublin Four Courts Press 2000
Hewer, Stephen Justice for All? Access by ethnic groups to the English royal courts in Ireland 1252-1318 University of Dublin thesis 2018

Notes

People from Somerset
Serjeants-at-law (Ireland)
Justices of the Irish Common Pleas
Year of birth uncertain
1307 deaths